Pulse and Cocktails is a chain of sex shops in England, specialising in lingerie, bondage, sex toys and other items. They also have an eCommerce website offering Click + Collect in-store and Delivery.

History
Pulse and Cocktails was a mail-order service for 30 years, eventually setting up its first shop in Rotherham in 1997. It currently has 18 different branches all of which are in England. The company also sells pornographic films in-store only.

The Rotherham branch is said to be the biggest sex shop in Europe, and the second biggest in the world after the Hustler store in California.

Branches
There are currently 18 Pulse and Cocktails stores.

References

External links
Pulse and Cocktails homepage

Sex shops
Retail companies of the United Kingdom
Sex industry in England
Service companies of England